Billy Watts may refer to:

Billy Watts (musician), guitarist with Red Young and Eric Burdon
Billy Watts (rugby), see 2008 Leeds Rhinos season 
Billy Watts (actor), see Happy Days Are Here Again (film)

See also
William Watts (disambiguation)
Bill Watts, American wrestler and promoter